José Renato da Silva Júnior (born 19 January 1990), simply known as Renato, is a Brazilian professional footballer who plays as either a right back or a right winger for CRB.

Honours
Sport
Campeonato Pernambucano: 2010, 2014
Copa do Nordeste: 2014

Ceará
Campeonato Cearense: 2018

Chapecoense
Campeonato Catarinense: 2020

Avaí
Campeonato Catarinense: 2021

References

External links
 

1990 births
Living people
People from Maceió
Brazilian footballers
Association football defenders
Association football forwards
Campeonato Brasileiro Série A players
Campeonato Brasileiro Série B players
Sport Club do Recife players
ABC Futebol Clube players
Fluminense FC players
Ceará Sporting Club players
Avaí FC players
Associação Chapecoense de Futebol players
Clube de Regatas Brasil players
Sportspeople from Alagoas